Karl Berg (27 December 1908 – 1 September 1997) was an Austrian Catholic cleric and Archbishop of Salzburg from 1973 to 1988.

Life 
Berg was born on 27 December 1908 in the Austrian town of Radstadt. He was ordained into priesthood on 29 October 1933. Following his selection as Archbishop of Salzburg in 1972, he was confirmed on 9 January 1973. He held the post until his retirement on 5 September 1988. From 1985 to 1988, he was president of the Austrian Bishops' Conference. He died on 1 September 1997.

His motto was Uni Trinoque Domino, which is translated from Latin as "To the One and Threefold Lord".

References 

1908 births
1997 deaths
20th-century Roman Catholic archbishops in Austria
Bishops appointed by Pope Paul VI
Roman Catholic archbishops of Salzburg